This is a list of the National Register of Historic Places listings in Orange County, Texas.

This is intended to be a complete list of properties and districts listed on the National Register of Historic Places in Orange County, Texas. There are one district, six individual properties, and one former property listed on the National Register in the county. Five individually listed properties and the former property are Recorded Texas Historic Landmarks.

Current listings

The locations of National Register properties and districts may be seen in a mapping service provided.

|}

Former listing

|}

See also

National Register of Historic Places listings in Texas
Recorded Texas Historic Landmarks in Orange County

References

External links

Orange County, Texas
Orange County
Buildings and structures in Orange County, Texas